Gonyleptidae is a neotropical family of harvestmen (Order Opiliones) with more than 800 species, the largest in the Suborder Laniatores and the second largest of the Opiliones as a whole. The largest known harvestmen are gonyleptids.

Like most harvestmen, gonyleptids are almost exclusively nocturnal, except some Caelopyginae, Goniosomatinae, (during reproductive season), Gonyleptinae, Mitobatinae, Pachylinae and Progonyleptoidellinae. Most species inhabit dense tropical, subtropical and temperate (Chile) forests, but some occur in open vegetation as the Pampas, the Cerrado, and the Caatinga. There are some species that live in caves, but only three troglobites are recorded for the family.

Name 

The family is named after the type genus Gonyleptes, which is derived from Greek gony, gonatos = joint, knee + leptos, ê, on = thin, fine, delicate. Gg

Diagnosis 

Laniatores with coxa IV immensely developed, widely surpassing dorsal scutum in dorsal view in most species. Many species with double ozopore. Pedipalpus with cylindrical segments, strongly spined, tibia and tarsus flattened ventrally. Basal segments of leg IV with strong sexual dimorphism, shown either in spination, curvature or length. Penis with ventral plate well defined, glans may bear ventral and/or dorsal processes.

Distribution 

Recorded continuously from the southernmost tip of the South American continent (Southern Chile and Argentina), Falklands to Costa Rica, with one isolated species cited from Guatemala.

Subfamilies 

At the moment, Gonyleptidae comprises 16 subfamilies, 284 genera and 823 species:

 Ampycinae (2 genera; 3 species) 
 Bourguyiinae (8; 15)
 Caelopyginae (9; 29) 
 Cobaniinae (1; 2)
 Goniosomatinae (5; 46)
 Gonyassamiinae (2; 3) 
 Gonyleptinae (38; 142) 
 Hernandariinae (4; 12) 
 Heteropachylinae (8; 11) 
 Mitobatinae (1; 45) 
 Pachylinae (129; 400) 
 Pachylospeleinae (1; 1) 
 Progonyleptoidellinae (10; 17) 
Roeweriinae
 Sodreaninae (4; 5)
 Tricommatinae (29; 51)

Note: Metasarcinae was formerly included as a subfamily of Gonyleptidae, now raised to family level: Metasarcidae.

Relationships 

Gonyleptidae is the sister-group of Cosmetidae and both are related to the Stygnidae and Cranaidae (Kury, 1992).

References 

 
 
 

Harvestman families